Peixonauta – Agente Secreto da O.S.T.R.A. is a 2012 Brazilian animated film directed by Célia Catunda and Kiko Mistrorigo based on the Fishtronaut animated TV series.

The film is a compilation of five episodes of the cartoon.

Plot
Fishtronaut prepares for a new adventure, this time to be a Secret Agent of O.S.T.R.A. (Organização Secreta para Total Recuperação Ambiental, in English "Secret Organization for Total Environmental Restoration"; ostra means "oyster" in English). To earn the badge, he must serve seven missions with the help of his friends Marina and Zeek and the whole gang of the Smiling Trees Park.

External links

References

Brazilian animated films
Brazilian children's films
Environmental films
Flash animated films
Paramount Pictures films
Animated films based on animated series
Animated films about fish
Animated films about monkeys
Animated films about children
Animated anthology films